The 1938 Philadelphia Phillies season was a season in American baseball. The team finished in eighth place – last in an eight-team National League – with a record of 45–105, 43 games behind the first-place Chicago Cubs and 24.5 games behind the seventh-place Brooklyn Dodgers. It was the first of five straight seasons in which the Phillies finished in last place. The Phillies wore blue and yellow on their uniforms in honor of the Tercentenary of New Sweden.

The Phillies moved from their old home park, Baker Bowl, to Shibe Park midway through the season. Phillies president Gerald Nugent was eager to cut expenses and he cited the move as an opportunity for the Phillies to cut expenses by sharing stadium upkeep with the Philadelphia Athletics.

Offseason 
 December 8, 1937: Earl Grace was traded by the Phillies to the St. Louis Browns for Cap Clark.

Regular season

Season standings

Record vs. opponents

Game log 

|- style="background:#fbb"
| 1 || April 19 || Dodgers || 5–12 || Luke Hamlin (1–0) || Wayne LaMaster (0–1) || None || 10,000 || 0–1
|- style="background:#bfb"
| 2 || April 20 || Dodgers || 6–5 || Bucky Walters (1–0) || Max Butcher (0–1) || None || 2,000 || 1–1
|- style="background:#fbb"
| 3 || April 21 || Dodgers || 0–9 || Tot Pressnell (1–0) || Hugh Mulcahy (0–1) || None || 2,000 || 1–2
|- style="background:#bbb"
| – || April 22 || @ Bees || colspan=6 | Postponed (rain); Makeup: July 1 as a traditional double-header
|- style="background:#fbb"
| 4 || April 23 || @ Bees || 1–3 || Lou Fette (1–0) || Bill Hallahan (0–1) || None || 10,180 || 1–3
|- style="background:#fbb"
| 5 || April 24 || @ Bees || 0–2 || Danny MacFayden (1–1) || Bucky Walters (1–1) || None || 11,216 || 1–4
|- style="background:#bbb"
| – || April 25 || @ Giants || colspan=6 | Postponed (rain and inclement weather); Makeup: April 27 as a traditional double-header
|- style="background:#fbb"
| 6 || April 26 || @ Giants || 8–12 || Dick Coffman (1–0) || Wayne LaMaster (0–2) || None || 5,871 || 1–5
|- style="background:#fbb"
| 7 || April 27  || @ Giants || 3–7 || Harry Gumbert (2–0) || Hugh Mulcahy (0–2) || None ||  || 1–6
|- style="background:#fbb"
| 8 || April 27  || @ Giants || 6–11 || Cliff Melton (3–0) || Syl Johnson (0–1) || None || 21,829 || 1–7
|- style="background:#fbb"
| 9 || April 28 || @ Dodgers || 3–6 || Luke Hamlin (2–1) || Bucky Walters (1–2) || Max Butcher (1) || 6,745 || 1–8
|- style="background:#fbb"
| 10 || April 29 || @ Dodgers || 4–5  || Tot Pressnell (2–1) || Bill Hallahan (0–2) || None || 5,123 || 1–9
|- style="background:#fbb"
| 11 || April 30 || Bees || 11–16 || Johnny Niggeling (1–0) || Tommy Reis (0–1) || Ira Hutchinson (1) || 2,500 || 1–10
|-

|- style="background:#bfb"
| 12 || May 1 || Bees || 5–1 || Hugh Mulcahy (1–2) || Jim Turner (2–1) || None || 5,000 || 2–10
|- style="background:#fbb"
| 13 || May 3 || @ Cubs || 2–5 || Dizzy Dean (3–0) || Bucky Walters (1–3) || Charlie Root (2) || 8,327 || 2–11
|- style="background:#bfb"
| 14 || May 4 || @ Cubs || 6–4 || Claude Passeau (1–0) || Larry French (1–2) || Al Smith (1) || 5,048 || 3–11
|- style="background:#fbb"
| 15 || May 5 || @ Cubs || 2–21 || Al Epperly (1–0) || Wayne LaMaster (0–3) || None || 1,314 || 3–12
|- style="background:#fbb"
| 16 || May 6 || @ Cardinals || 3–4 || Curt Davis (1–1) || Hugh Mulcahy (1–3) || None || 1,858 || 3–13
|- style="background:#bbb"
| – || May 7 || @ Cardinals || colspan=6 | Postponed (rain); Makeup: July 17 as a traditional double-header
|- style="background:#bfb"
| 17 || May 8 || @ Reds || 2–0 || Bucky Walters (2–3) ||  || None || 11,116 || 4–13
|- style="background:#fbb"
| 18 || May 9 || @ Reds || 4–9 || Peaches Davis (2–3) || Claude Passeau (1–1) || None || 540 || 4–14
|- style="background:#fbb"
| 19 || May 10 || @ Reds || 3–7 || Joe Cascarella (2–0) || Hugh Mulcahy (1–4) || None || 947 || 4–15
|- style="background:#bbb"
| – || May 11 || @ Pirates || colspan=6 | Postponed (cold and rain); Makeup: June 12 as a traditional double-header
|- style="background:#bbb"
| – || May 12 || @ Pirates || colspan=6 | Postponed (cold and rain); Makeup: July 20 as a traditional double-header
|- style="background:#bbb"
| – || May 14 || Giants || colspan=6 | Postponed (rain); Makeup: June 29 as a traditional double-header
|- style="background:#bbb"
| – || May 15 || Giants || colspan=6 | Postponed (rain); Makeup: August 13 as a traditional double-header
|- style="background:#bfb"
| 20 || May 16 || Giants || 12–3 || Bucky Walters (3–3) || Hal Schumacher (2–2) || None || 1,500 || 5–15
|- style="background:#fbb"
| 21 || May 17 || Reds || 1–13 || Paul Derringer (5–2) || Claude Passeau (1–2) || None || 1,500 || 5–16
|- style="background:#bbb"
| – || May 18 || Reds || colspan=6 | Postponed (rain); Makeup: June 26 as a traditional double-header
|- style="background:#bfb"
| 22 || May 19 || Reds || 5–4 || Hugh Mulcahy (2–4) || Joe Cascarella (2–1) || None || 1,000 || 6–16
|- style="background:#fbb"
| 23 || May 20 || Cubs || 7–16 || Tex Carleton (4–2) || Bucky Walters (3–4) || Jack Russell (2) || 2,964 || 6–17
|- style="background:#fbb"
| 24 || May 21 || Cubs || 1–10 || Larry French (2–4) || Claude Passeau (1–3) || None || 5,000 || 6–18
|- style="background:#bfb"
| 25 || May 22 || Cardinals || 2–1 || Pete Sivess (1–0) || Bill McGee (2–1) || None || 5,000 || 7–18
|- style="background:#bfb"
| 26 || May 23 || Cardinals || 7–6 || Hugh Mulcahy (3–4) || Mike Ryba (0–1) || None || 1,000 || 8–18
|- style="background:#bbb"
| – || May 24 || Pirates || colspan=6 | Postponed (rain and wet grounds); Makeup: June 19 as a traditional double-header
|- style="background:#bfb"
| 27 || May 25 || Pirates || 2–1 || Bucky Walters (4–4) || Jim Tobin (3–3) || None || 1,000 || 9–18
|- style="background:#bbb"
| – || May 26 || Pirates || colspan=6 | Postponed (rain); Makeup: September 18 as a traditional double-header
|- style="background:#bbb"
| – || May 27 || @ Giants || colspan=6 | Postponed (rain and wet grounds); Makeup: May 28 as a traditional double-header
|- style="background:#fbb"
| 28 || May 28  || @ Giants || 4–5 || Cliff Melton (7–1) || Hugh Mulcahy (3–5) || Dick Coffman (5) ||  || 9–19
|- style="background:#fbb"
| 29 || May 28  || @ Giants || 0–11 || Carl Hubbell (6–1) || Pete Sivess (1–1) || None || 26,476 || 9–20
|- style="background:#fbb"
| 30 || May 29 || @ Giants || 6–7 || Harry Gumbert (4–3) || Bucky Walters (4–5) || Jumbo Brown (1) || 14,889 || 9–21
|- style="background:#bfb"
| 31 || May 30  || @ Dodgers || 9–5 || Claude Passeau (2–3) || Vito Tamulis (0–4) || None ||  || 10–21
|- style="background:#bfb"
| 32 || May 30  || @ Dodgers || 7–4 || Wayne LaMaster (1–3) || Van Mungo (2–5) || Pete Sivess (1) || 18,500 || 11–21
|-

|- style="background:#fbb"
| 33 || June 1 || @ Cardinals || 4–9 || Ray Harrell (2–1) || Hugh Mulcahy (3–6) || None || 1,471 || 11–22
|- style="background:#fbb"
| 34 || June 2 || @ Cardinals || 5–12 || Roy Henshaw (1–0) || Bucky Walters (4–6) || None || 1,635 || 11–23
|- style="background:#fbb"
| 35 || June 3 || @ Cardinals || 7–8  || Max Macon (1–4) || Al Smith (0–1) || None || 1,456 || 11–24
|- style="background:#fbb"
| 36 || June 4 || @ Cubs || 1–5 || Larry French (4–5) || Claude Passeau (2–4) || None || 8,505 || 11–25
|- style="background:#fbb"
| 37 || June 5 || @ Cubs || 1–7 || Tex Carleton (6–3) || Hugh Mulcahy (3–7) || None || 17,311 || 11–26
|- style="background:#fbb"
| 38 || June 6 || @ Cubs || 8–10 || Charlie Root (3–1) || Bucky Walters (4–7) || Bob Logan (2) || 2,906 || 11–27
|- style="background:#bbb"
| – || June 7 || @ Reds || colspan=6 | Postponed (rain); Makeup: July 22 as a traditional double-header
|- style="background:#fbb"
| 39 || June 8 || @ Reds || 5–7 || Paul Derringer (8–4) || Claude Passeau (2–5) || None || 14,898 || 11–28
|- style="background:#bfb"
| 40 || June 10 || @ Pirates || 3–2 || Hugh Mulcahy (4–7) || Russ Bauers (1–4) || None || 1,034 || 12–28
|- style="background:#fbb"
| 41 || June 11 || @ Pirates || 3–4 || Bill Swift (3–2) || Bucky Walters (4–8) || None || 3,811 || 12–29
|- style="background:#fbb"
| 42 || June 12  || @ Pirates || 5–11 || Mace Brown (8–2) || Claude Passeau (2–6) || None || 4,826 || 12–30
|- style="background:#bbb"
| – || June 12  || @ Pirates || colspan=6 | Postponed (rain and Sunday curfew); Makeup: August 25 as a traditional double-header
|- style="background:#fbb"
| 43 || June 14 || Cardinals || 3–4 || Curt Davis (6–2) || Hugh Mulcahy (4–8) || None || 1,000 || 12–31
|- style="background:#fbb"
| 44 || June 15 || Cardinals || 7–9 || Mike Ryba (1–1) || Syl Johnson (0–2) || Clyde Shoun (1) || 1,500 || 12–32
|- style="background:#bfb"
| 45 || June 16 || Cardinals || 3–2 || Claude Passeau (3–6) || Bill McGee (2–5) || None || 975 || 13–32
|- style="background:#fbb"
| 46 || June 17 || Pirates || 3–4  || Mace Brown (9–2) || Al Hollingsworth (2–3) || None || 4,000 || 13–33
|- style="background:#bfb"
| 47 || June 18 || Pirates || 5–3 || Hugh Mulcahy (5–8) || Russ Bauers (1–6) || Claude Passeau (1) || 3,000 || 14–33
|- style="background:#fbb"
| 48 || June 19  || Pirates || 4–14 || Jim Tobin (5–3) || Pete Sivess (1–2) || None ||  || 14–34
|- style="background:#fbb"
| 49 || June 19  || Pirates || 3–16 || Cy Blanton (2–1) || Wayne LaMaster (1–4) || None || 10,000 || 14–35
|- style="background:#fbb"
| 50 || June 21 || Cubs || 3–4 || Al Epperly (2–0) || Claude Passeau (3–7) || Charlie Root (4) || 1,200 || 14–36
|- style="background:#bbb"
| – || June 22 || Cubs || colspan=6 | Postponed (rain); Makeup: July 31 as a traditional double-header
|- style="background:#bbb"
| – || June 23 || Cubs || colspan=6 | Postponed (rain); Makeup: September 20 as a traditional double-header
|- style="background:#fbb"
| 51 || June 24 || Reds || 4–6 || Peaches Davis (4–3) || Al Hollingsworth (2–4) || Joe Cascarella (3) || 5,000 || 14–37
|- style="background:#bfb"
| 52 || June 25 || Reds || 7–6  || Al Hollingsworth (3–4) || Joe Cascarella (3–4) || None || 2,500 || 15–37
|- style="background:#bfb"
| 53 || June 26  || Reds || 10–3 || Claude Passeau (4–7) || Jim Weaver (4–3) || None ||  || 16–37
|- style="background:#fbb"
| 54 || June 26  || Reds || 5–8 || Paul Derringer (10–5) || Wayne LaMaster (1–5) || None || 8,520 || 16–38
|- style="background:#bbb"
| – || June 28 || Giants || colspan=6 | Postponed (rain); Makeup: August 14 as a traditional double-header
|- style="background:#fbb"
| 55 || June 29  || Giants || 1–9 || Hal Schumacher (7–5) || Al Hollingsworth (3–5) || None ||  || 16–39
|- style="background:#fbb"
| 56 || June 29  || Giants || 2–6 || Cliff Melton (8–5) || Hugh Mulcahy (5–9) || None || 8,000 || 16–40
|- style="background:#fbb"
| 57 || June 30 || Giants || 1–14 || Slick Castleman (3–2) || Claude Passeau (4–8) || None || 1,500 || 16–41
|-

|- style="background:#bfb"
| 58 || July 1  || @ Bees || 4–1 || Claude Passeau (5–8) || Bobby Reis (0–1) || None ||  || 17–41
|- style="background:#bfb"
| 59 || July 1  || @ Bees || 5–0 || Wayne LaMaster (2–5) || Dick Errickson (0–4) || None || 2,313 || 18–41
|- style="background:#fbb"
| 60 || July 2 || @ Bees || 1–2 || Ira Hutchinson (4–4) || Syl Johnson (0–3) || None || 7,252 || 18–42
|- style="background:#fbb"
| 61 || July 3  || @ Dodgers || 1–3 || Vito Tamulis (2–6) || Al Hollingsworth (3–6) || None ||  || 18–43
|- style="background:#fbb"
| 62 || July 3  || @ Dodgers || 0–2 || Bill Posedel (4–4) || Bill Hallahan (0–3) || None || 10,157 || 18–44
|- style="background:#fbb"
| 63 || July 4  || Bees || 5–10 || Bobby Reis (1–1) || Hugh Mulcahy (5–10) || None ||  || 18–45
|- style="background:#bfb"
| 64 || July 4  || Bees || 10–2 || Claude Passeau (6–8) || Dick Errickson (0–5) || None || 12,000 || 19–45
|- style="background:#bbcaff;"
| – || July 6 ||colspan="7" | 1938 Major League Baseball All-Star Game at Crosley Field in Cincinnati
|- style="background:#fbb"
| 65 || July 8 || Dodgers || 2–13 || Vito Tamulis (3–6) || Hugh Mulcahy (5–11) || None || 2,500 || 19–46
|- style="background:#bfb"
| 66 || July 9 || Dodgers || 4–3  || Claude Passeau (7–8) || Luke Hamlin (4–6) || None || 1,277 || 20–46
|- style="background:#fbb"
| 67 || July 10  || Dodgers || 3–6 || Tot Pressnell (7–7) || Al Hollingsworth (3–7) || Vito Tamulis (2) ||  || 20–47
|- style="background:#bfb"
| 68 || July 10  || Dodgers || 5–3 || Wayne LaMaster (3–5) || Max Butcher (4–4) || Pete Sivess (2) || 4,949 || 21–47
|- style="background:#bbb"
| – || July 13 || @ Cubs || colspan=6 | Postponed (wet grounds and rain); Makeup: July 14 as a traditional double-header
|- style="background:#fbb"
| 69 || July 14  || @ Cubs || 0–3 || Clay Bryant (7–7) || Claude Passeau (7–9) || None || 10,000 || 21–48
|- style="background:#fbb"
| 70 || July 14  || @ Cubs || 1–5 || Bill Lee (10–5) || Hugh Mulcahy (5–12) || None || 9,581 || 21–49
|- style="background:#fbb"
| 71 || July 15 || @ Cubs || 1–4 || Larry French (6–12) || Wayne LaMaster (3–6) || None || 5,581 || 21–50
|- style="background:#bfb"
| 72 || July 16 || @ Cardinals || 2–1 || Al Hollingsworth (4–7)|| Lon Warneke (6–4) || None || 1,781 || 22–50
|- style="background:#bbb"
| – || July 17  || @ Cardinals || colspan=6 | Postponed (rain); Makeup: August 30 as a traditional double-header
|- style="background:#bbb"
| – || July 17  || @ Cardinals || colspan=6 | Postponed (rain); Makeup: August 31 as a traditional double-header
|- style="background:#fbb"
| 73 || July 18 || @ Cardinals || 3–5 || Curt Davis (8–2) || Claude Passeau (7–10) || Max Macon (2) || 95 || 22–51
|- style="background:#fbb"
| 74 || July 19 || @ Pirates || 0–8 || Ed Brandt (2–2) || Hugh Mulcahy (5–13) || None || 2,472 || 22–52
|- style="background:#bfb"
| 75 || July 20  || @ Pirates || 11–0 || Al Hollingsworth (5–7) || Bob Klinger (8–2) || None ||  || 23–52
|- style="background:#fbb"
| 76 || July 20  || @ Pirates || 1–4 || Russ Bauers (5–7) || Pete Sivess (1–3) || None || 6,000 || 23–53
|- style="background:#fbb"
| 77 || July 21 || @ Pirates || 4–5 || Mace Brown (13–3) || Al Smith (0–2) || None || 10,535 || 23–54
|- style="background:#fbb"
| 78 || July 22  || @ Reds || 2–5 || Paul Derringer (12–7) || Claude Passeau (7–11) || None ||  || 23–55
|- style="background:#bfb"
| 79 || July 22  || @ Reds || 11–10 || Wayne LaMaster (4–6) || Peaches Davis (5–6) || Hugh Mulcahy (1) || 5,419 || 24–55
|- style="background:#fbb"
| 80 || July 23 || @ Reds || 9–10 || Gene Schott (3–2) || Bill Hallahan (0–4) || None || 3,619 || 24–56
|- style="background:#fbb"
| 81 || July 24  || @ Reds || 5–7 || Whitey Moore (2–0) || Al Hollingsworth (5–8) || Paul Derringer (1) ||  || 24–57
|- style="background:#bfb"
| 82 || July 24  || @ Reds || 5–1 || Syl Johnson (1–3) ||  || None || 26,630 || 25–57
|- style="background:#bfb"
| 83 || July 26 || Pirates || 6–5 || Pete Sivess (2–3) || Mace Brown (13–4) || None || 1,500 || 26–57
|- style="background:#fbb"
| 84 || July 27 || Pirates || 2–4 || Russ Bauers (6–8) || Bill Hallahan (0–5) || None || 1,000 || 26–58
|- style="background:#fbb"
| 85 || July 28 || Pirates || 2–9 || Jim Tobin (9–4) || Al Hollingsworth (5–9) || None || 2,000 || 26–59
|- style="background:#bfb"
| 86 || July 29 || Cubs || 5–4  || Pete Sivess (3–3) || Larry French (7–14) || None || 3,000 || 27–59
|- style="background:#bfb"
| 87 || July 30 || Cubs || 5–4 || Claude Passeau (8–11) || Larry French (7–15) || None || 1,931 || 28–59
|- style="background:#bfb"
| 88 || July 31  || Cubs || 6–5  || Syl Johnson (2–3) || Bill Lee (13–6) || None ||  || 29–59
|- style="background:#fbb"
| 89 || July 31  || Cubs || 3–4  || Charlie Root (4–2) || Hugh Mulcahy (5–14) || None || 15,000 || 29–60
|-

|- style="background:#fbb"
| 90 || August 2 || Reds || 2–3 ||  || Wayne LaMaster (4–7) || Paul Derringer (2) || 2,000 || 29–61
|- style="background:#fbb"
| 91 || August 3 || Reds || 3–6  || Whitey Moore (3–0) || Claude Passeau (8–12) || None || 1,845 || 29–62
|- style="background:#bbb"
| – || August 4 || Reds || colspan=6 | Postponed (rain); Makeup: September 16 as a traditional double-header
|- style="background:#fbb"
| 92 || August 5 || Cardinals || 0–3 || Lon Warneke (9–5) || Hugh Mulcahy (5–15) || None || 1,246 || 29–63
|- style="background:#fbb"
| 93 || August 6 || Cardinals || 6–7 || Bob Weiland (11–8) || Al Hollingsworth (5–10) || Curt Davis (2) || 1,000 || 29–64
|- style="background:#bfb"
| 94 || August 7  || Cardinals || 6–3 || Claude Passeau (9–12) || Clyde Shoun (2–5) || None ||  || 30–64
|- style="background:#fbb"
| 95 || August 7  || Cardinals || 1–5  || Bill McGee (4–9) || Bill Hallahan (0–6) || None || 3,500 || 30–65
|- style="background:#fbb"
| 96 || August 9 || @ Dodgers || 6–9 || Tot Pressnell (10–11) || Syl Johnson (2–4) || Luke Hamlin (5) || 3,268 || 30–66
|- style="background:#fbb"
| 97 || August 12 || Giants || 0–1 || Harry Gumbert (10–9) || Al Hollingsworth (5–11) || None || 5,000 || 30–67
|- style="background:#fbb"
| 98 || August 13  || Giants || 1–11 || Carl Hubbell (13–9) || Claude Passeau (9–13) || None ||  || 30–68
|- style="background:#bfb"
| 99 || August 13  || Giants || 4–2 || Max Butcher (6–4) || Cliff Melton (9–11) || None || 10,000 || 31–68
|- style="background:#fbb"
| 100 || August 14  || Giants || 0–11 || Hal Schumacher (10–7) || Hugh Mulcahy (5–16) || Jumbo Brown (2) ||  || 31–69
|- style="background:#fbb"
| 101 || August 14  || Giants || 6–14 || Bill Lohrman (7–1) || Pete Sivess (3–4) || Dick Coffman (12) || 12,000 || 31–70
|- style="background:#fbb"
| 102 || August 15 || Bees || 3–5 || Dick Errickson (4–5) || Syl Johnson (2–5) || None || 700 || 31–71
|- style="background:#bfb"
| 103 || August 16 || Bees || 7–6  || Hugh Mulcahy (6–16) || Milt Shoffner (5–5) || None || 1,000 || 32–71
|- style="background:#fbb"
| 104 || August 17 || Bees || 0–3  || Ira Hutchinson (5–7) || Max Butcher (6–5) || None || 1,000 || 32–72
|- style="background:#bbb"
| – || August 18 || Bees || colspan=6 | Postponed (wet grounds and rain); Makeup: September 11 as a traditional double-header
|- style="background:#fbb"
| 105 || August 19 || @ Giants || 2–4 || Bill Lohrman (8–1) || Bill Hallahan (0–7) || None || 10,967 || 32–73
|- style="background:#bfb"
| 106 || August 20 || @ Giants || 8–7 || Al Hollingsworth (6–11) || Jumbo Brown (3–3) || None || 6,771 || 33–73
|- style="background:#bfb"
| 107 || August 21 || @ Giants || 8–3 || Max Butcher (7–5) || Cliff Melton (10–12) || None || 8,970 || 34–73
|- style="background:#fbb"
| 108 || August 23 || @ Reds || 0–3 || Whitey Moore (5–1) ||  || None || 3,010 || 34–74
|- style="background:#fbb"
| 109 || August 24 || @ Reds || 1–3 || Lee Grissom (2–3) || Hugh Mulcahy (6–17) || Jim Weaver (1) || 4,156 || 34–75
|- style="background:#bfb"
| 110 || August 25  || @ Pirates || 2–1 || Max Butcher (8–5) || Cy Blanton (10–4) || None ||  || 35–75
|- style="background:#bfb"
| 111 || August 25  || @ Pirates || 2–1  || Bill Hallahan (1–7) || Red Lucas (4–3) || None || 3,093 || 36–75
|- style="background:#bfb"
| 112 || August 26 || @ Pirates || 6–4 || Al Smith (1–2) || Jim Tobin (11–7) || Pete Sivess (3) || 3,294 || 37–75
|- style="background:#fbb"
| 113 || August 27 || @ Pirates || 1–6 || Ed Brandt (5–2) || Al Hollingsworth (6–13) || None || 5,889 || 37–76
|- style="background:#fbb"
| 114 ||  || @ Cubs || 5–6  || Clay Bryant (13–10) || Pete Sivess (3–5) || None ||  || 37–77
|- style="background:#fbb"
| 115 || August 28  || @ Cubs || 1–3 || Vance Page (3–2) || Syl Johnson (2–6) || None || 26,348 || 37–78
|- style="background:#bfb"
| 116 || August 30  || @ Cardinals || 4–3 || Max Butcher (9–5) || Max Macon (2–9) || None ||  || 38–78
|- style="background:#fbb"
| 117 || August 30  || @ Cardinals || 7–8  || Clyde Shoun (4–5) || Al Smith (1–3) || None || 2,679 || 38–79
|- style="background:#fbb"
| 118 || August 31  || @ Cardinals || 1–2  || Clyde Shoun (5–5) || Claude Passeau (9–14) || None ||  || 38–80
|- style="background:#fbb"
| 119 || August 31  || @ Cardinals || 6–7 || Lon Warneke (13–5) || Al Hollingsworth (6–14) || None || 2,449 || 38–81
|-

|- style="background:#fbb"
| 120 || September 1 || @ Cardinals || 5–6 || Curt Davis (11–7) || Al Smith (1–4) || None || 1,134 || 38–82
|- style="background:#fbb"
| 121 || September 3 || @ Bees || 0–1 ||  || Max Butcher (9–6) || None || 5,276 || 38–83
|- style="background:#bfb"
| 122 || September 4  || @ Bees || 4–2 || Hugh Mulcahy (7–17) || Jim Turner (12–15) || None ||  || 39–83
|- style="background:#fbb"
| 123 || September 4  || @ Bees || 2–6 || Dick Errickson (7–6) || Syl Johnson (2–7) || None || 14,867 || 39–84
|- style="background:#fbb"
| 124 || September 5  || Giants || 0–7 || Cliff Melton (11–13) || Claude Passeau (9–15) || None ||  || 39–85
|- style="background:#bfb"
| 125 || September 5  || Giants || 4–3 || Al Hollingsworth (7–14) || Bill Lohrman (8–4) || None || 10,000 || 40–85
|- style="background:#fbb"
| 126 || September 6 || Dodgers || 4–6 || Vito Tamulis (9–9) || Bill Hallahan (1–8) || None || 500 || 40–86
|- style="background:#bfb"
| 127 || September 7 || Dodgers || 6–3 || Hugh Mulcahy (8–17) || Tot Pressnell (11–14) || None || 500 || 41–86
|- style="background:#fbb"
| 128 || September 8 || @ Dodgers || 0–5 || Luke Hamlin (10–12) || Max Butcher (9–7) || None || 11,908 || 41–87
|- style="background:#bfb"
| 129 || September 9 || Bees || 4–2 || Claude Passeau (10–15) || Lou Fette (11–10) || None || 1,000 || 42–87
|- style="background:#fbb"
| 130 || September 10 || Bees || 5–6 || Johnny Lanning (8–7) || Al Hollingsworth (7–15) || None || 1,000 || 42–88
|- style="background:#bfb"
| 131 || September 11  || Bees || 11–2 || Hugh Mulcahy (9–17) || Danny MacFayden (12–8) || None ||  || 43–88
|- style="background:#fbb"
| 132 || September 11  || Bees || 2–3 || Ira Hutchinson (7–8) || Max Butcher (9–8) || Dick Errickson (6) || 2,500 || 43–89
|- style="background:#bbb"
| – || September 13 || Cardinals || colspan=6 | Postponed (rain and wet grounds); Makeup: September 14 as a traditional double-header
|- style="background:#fbb"
| 133 || September 14  || Cardinals || 9–12 || Max Macon (4–11) || Claude Passeau (10–16) || None ||  || 43–90
|- style="background:#fbb"
| 134 || September 14  || Cardinals || 2–3 || Mort Cooper (1–0) || Al Hollingsworth (7–16) || None || 1,000 || 43–91
|- style="background:#fbb"
| 135 || September 16  || Reds || 0–2 || Paul Derringer (20–12) || Max Butcher (9–9) || None ||  || 43–92
|- style="background:#bfb"
| 136 || September 16  || Reds || 2–1 || Hugh Mulcahy (10–17) || Whitey Moore (6–3) || None || 3,000 || 44–92
|- style="background:#bbb"
| – || September 17 || Reds || colspan=6 | Canceled (rain); No makeup scheduled
|- style="background:#fbb"
| 137 || September 18  || Pirates || 0–1 || Russ Bauers (11–13) ||  || None ||  || 44–93
|- style="background:#fffdd0"
| 138 || September 18  || Pirates || 1–1  || None || None || None || 1,500 || 44–93–1
|- style="background:#bbb"
| – || September 19  || Pirates || colspan=6 | Canceled (rain); No makeup scheduled
|- style="background:#bbb"
| – || September 19  || Pirates || colspan=6 | Canceled (rain); No makeup scheduled
|- style="background:#bbb"
| – || September 20  || Cubs || colspan=6 | Postponed (rain); Makeup: September 21 as a traditional double-header
|- style="background:#bbb"
| – || September 20  || Cubs || colspan=6 | Postponed (rain); Makeup: September 22 as a traditional double-header
|- style="background:#bbb"
| – || September 21  || Cubs || colspan=6 | Postponed (rain); Makeup: September 23 as a traditional double-header
|- style="background:#bbb"
| – || September 21  || Cubs || colspan=6 | Postponed (rain); Makeup: September 23 as a traditional double-header
|- style="background:#fbb"
| 139 || September 22  || Cubs || 0–4 || Bill Lee (20–9) || Max Butcher (9–10) || None ||  || 44–94–1
|- style="background:#fbb"
| 140 || September 22  || Cubs || 1–2 || Clay Bryant (18–11) || Claude Passeau (10–17) || None || 2,000 || 44–95–1
|- style="background:#fbb"
| 141 || September 23  || Cubs || 2–3 || Jack Russell (6–1) || Hugh Mulcahy (10–18) || None ||  || 44–96–1
|- style="background:#fbb"
| 142 || September 23  || Cubs || 6–7 || Larry French (10–18) || Al Hollingsworth (7–18) || None || 1,000 || 44–97–1
|- style="background:#fbb"
| 143 || September 24 || @ Dodgers || 1–8 || Vito Tamulis (11–9) || Tom Lanning (0–1) || None || 2,772 || 44–98–1
|- style="background:#fbb"
| 144 ||  || @ Dodgers || 1–5 || Luke Hamlin (12–14) || Max Butcher (9–11) || Tot Pressnell (3) ||  || 44–99–1
|- style="background:#bfb"
| 145 || September 25  || @ Dodgers || 5–1  || Claude Passeau (11–17) || Lee Rogers (1–3) || None || 8,124 || 45–99–1
|- style="background:#fbb"
| 146 || September 27  || @ Bees || 1–2  || Jim Turner (14–17) || Hugh Mulcahy (10–19) || None ||  || 45–100–1
|- style="background:#fbb"
| 147 || September 27  || @ Bees || 1–4 || Tom Earley (1–0) || Elmer Burkart (0–1) || None || 11,617 || 45–101–1
|- style="background:#fbb"
| 148 || September 28 || @ Bees || 1–3 || Ira Hutchinson (9–8) || Pete Sivess (3–6) || None || 952 || 45–102–1
|- style="background:#fbb"
| 149 || September 29 || @ Giants || 2–9 || Cliff Melton (14–14) || Max Butcher (9–12) || None || 1,190 || 
|- style="background:#bbb"
| – || September 30 || @ Giants || colspan=6 | Canceled (rain); No makeup scheduled
|-

|- style="background:#fbb"
| 150 ||  || Dodgers || 3–7 || Sam Nahem (1–0) ||  || None ||  || 
|- style="background:#fbb"
| 151 || October 2  || Dodgers || 2–7 || John Gaddy (2–0) || Hugh Mulcahy (10–20) || None || 500 || 45–105–1
|-

| style="text-align:left;" |
The second game on June 12, 1938, was called due to the Pennsylvania Sunday curfew in the middle of the second inning with the score 0–0. Since the game was not yet official, it was replayed from the beginning on August 25.
The June 30, 1938, game was protested by the Phillies in the bottom of the first inning. The protest is not mentioned in contemporary newspaper accounts.
The original schedule indicated single games on July 3 and August 10 in Brooklyn which became a double-header on July 3. Contemporary newspaper accounts indicated the August 10 game was postponed due to rain.
The original schedule indicated single games on July 10 (in Philadelphia) and August 11 (in Brooklyn) with Brooklyn which became a double-header on July 10 (in Philadelphia).
The original schedule indicated single games on June 9 and July 24 at Cincinnati which became a double-header on July 24.
The second game on July 31, 1938, ended after seven innings due to the Pennsylvania Sunday curfew law with the score 3–4.
The original schedule indicated single games on August 7 and September 15 with St. Louis which became a double-header on August 7.
The original schedule indicated single games on August 28 and 29 at Chicago which became a double-header on August 28.
The original schedule indicated a home game on September 8 with Brooklyn which became an away game at Brooklyn. This became necessary because the August 11 away game at Brooklyn became the July 10 home game in Philadelphia.(See note d above.)
The September 18, 1938, game ended after five innings due to darkness with the score tied 1–1, and an additional game was scheduled for September 19.
The original schedule indicated single games on September 23 and 25 at Brooklyn which became a double-header on September 25. September 23 was used to reschedule home games with Chicago that were postponed due to rain on September 20 and 21.
The original schedule indicated single games on September 26 and 27 at Boston which became a double-header on September 27.
The original schedule indicated single games on October 1 and 2 with Brooklyn which became a double-header on October 2.

Roster

Player stats

Batting

Starters by position 
Note: Pos = Position; G = Games played; AB = At bats; H = Hits; Avg. = Batting average; HR = Home runs; RBI = Runs batted in

Other batters 
Note: G = Games played; AB = At bats; H = Hits; Avg. = Batting average; HR = Home runs; RBI = Runs batted in

Pitching

Starting pitchers 
Note: G = Games pitched; IP = Innings pitched; W = Wins; L = Losses; ERA = Earned run average; SO = Strikeouts

Other pitchers 
Note: G = Games pitched; IP = Innings pitched; W = Wins; L = Losses; ERA = Earned run average; SO = Strikeouts

Relief pitchers 
Note: G = Games pitched; W = Wins; L = Losses; SV = Saves; ERA = Earned run average; SO = Strikeouts

Farm system

Notes

References 
1938 Philadelphia Phillies season at Baseball Reference

Philadelphia Phillies seasons
Philadelphia Phillies season
Philly